Latisha Chan and Martina Hingis were the defending champions, but Hingis retired from professional tennis at the end of 2017. Chan played alongside her sister Chan Hao-ching, but lost in the second round to Hsieh Su-wei and Barbora Strýcová.

Hsieh and Strýcová went on to win the title, defeating Ekaterina Makarova and Elena Vesnina in the final, 6–4, 6–4.

Seeds

Draw

Finals

Top half

Bottom half

References
 Main Draw

BNP Paribas Open – Women's Doubles
2018 BNP Paribas Open